Mechatronics engineering also called mechatronics, is an interdisciplinary branch of engineering that focuses on the integration of mechanical, electrical and electronic engineering systems, and also includes a combination of robotics, electronics, computer science, telecommunications, systems, control, and product engineering.

As technology advances over time, various subfields of engineering have succeeded in both adapting and multiplying. The intention of mechatronics is to produce a design solution that unifies each of these various subfields. Originally, the field of mechatronics was intended to be nothing more than a combination of mechanics, electrical and electronics, hence the name being a portmanteau of the words "mechanics" and "electronics"; however, as the complexity of technical systems continued to evolve, the definition had been broadened to include more technical areas.

The word mechatronics originated in Japanese-English and was created by Tetsuro Mori, an engineer of Yaskawa Electric Corporation. The word mechatronics was registered as trademark by the company in Japan with the registration number of "46-32714" in 1971. The company later released the right to use the word to the public, and the word began being used globally. Currently the word is translated into many languages and is considered an essential term for advanced automated industry.

Many people treat mechatronics as a modern buzzword synonymous with automation, robotics and electromechanical engineering.

French standard NF E 01-010 gives the following definition: "approach aiming at the synergistic integration of mechanics, electronics, control theory, and computer science within product design and manufacturing, in order to improve and/or optimize its functionality".

History 
The word mechatronics was registered as trademark by the company in Japan with the registration number of "46-32714" in 1971. The company later released the right to use the word to the public, and the word began being used globally.

With the advent of information technology in the 1980s, microprocessors were introduced into mechanical systems, improving performance significantly. By the 1990s, advances in computational intelligence were applied to mechatronics in ways that revolutionized the field.

Description

A mechatronics engineer unites the principles of mechanics, electrical, electronics, and computing to generate a simpler, more economical and reliable system.

Engineering cybernetics deals with the question of control engineering of mechatronic systems. It is used to control or regulate such a system (see control theory). Through collaboration, the mechatronic modules perform the production goals and inherit flexible and agile manufacturing properties in the production scheme. Modern production equipment consists of mechatronic modules that are integrated according to a control architecture. The most known architectures involve hierarchy, polyarchy, heterarchy, and hybrid. The methods for achieving a technical effect are described by control algorithms, which might or might not utilize formal methods in their design. Hybrid systems important to mechatronics include production systems, synergy drives,
exploration rovers, automotive subsystems such as anti-lock braking systems and spin-assist, and everyday equipment such as autofocus cameras, video, hard disks, CD players and phones.

Course structure
Mechatronics students take courses in various fields:

Engineering Mathematics
Mechanical engineering 
Electronics engineering 
Electrical engineering 
Materials science and engineering
Computer engineering
Computer aided and integrated manufacturing systems
Computer-aided design
Electronic design automation
Computer Science
Systems engineering 
Control engineering
Robotics

Applications

Applied Mechatronics 

 Machine vision
 Automation and robotics
 Servo-mechanics
 Sensing and control systems
 Automotive engineering, automotive equipment in the design of subsystems such as anti-lock braking systems
 Building automation / Home automation
 Computer-machine controls, such as computer driven machines like CNC milling machines, CNC waterjets, and CNC plasma cutters
 Expert systems
 Industrial goods
 Consumer products
 Mechatronics systems
 Medical mechatronics, medical imaging systems
 Structural dynamic systems
 Transportation and vehicular systems
 Mechatronics as the new language of the automobile
 Engineering and manufacturing systems
 Packaging
 Electronics
 Computers
 Microcontrollers / PLCs
 Microprocessors
 Biomechatronics

Physical implementations 

Mechanical modeling calls for modeling and simulating physical complex phenomena in the scope of a multi-scale and multi-physical approach. This implies to implement and to manage modeling and optimization methods and tools, which are integrated in a systemic approach.
The specialty is aimed for students in mechanics who want to open their mind to systems engineering, and able to integrate different physics or technologies, as well as students in mechatronics who want to increase their knowledge in optimization and multidisciplinary simulation techniques.
The specialty educates students in robust and/or optimized conception methods for structures or many technological systems, and to the main modeling and simulation tools used in R&D. Special courses are also proposed for original applications (multi-materials composites, innovating transducers and actuators, integrated systems, …) to prepare the students to the coming breakthrough in the domains covering the materials and the systems.
For some mechatronic systems, the main issue is no longer how to implement a control system, but how to implement actuators. Within the mechatronic field, mainly two technologies are used to produce movement/motion.

Subject 

 Automation and programmed logical controls
 Power and driving electronics
 Modern and digital control systems
 Robotics systems
 Mechatronics systems
 Automated control
 Computer applications for mechatronics
 Calculus
 Electrical circuits
 Systems Dynamics
 Dynamics and vibrations
 Artificial Intelligence
 Engineering Mathematics
 Numerical engineering methods
 Thermostatology
 General Physics
 Practical General Physics
 Signal measurements and processing
 General Chemistry
 Practical General Chemistry/Laboratory
 Principles of Statistics
 Sensors and power transformers
 Automated Control Laboratory
 Electrical Circuit Laboratory
 Dynamics and Vibration Laboratory
 Capability and Driving Electronics Laboratory
 Electronics Lab for Mechatronics
 Processing laboratory and microcontrollers
 Digital Logic Lab
 Hydraulic and Antenna Systems Laboratory
 Fluid Capability Engineering Laboratory
 Processing and microcontrollers
 Digital Logic
 Engineering materials and manufacturing technology
 Machinery mechanics
 Fluid capability engineering
Mathematics

Subdisciplines

Mechanical 

Mechanical engineering is an important part of mechatronics engineering. It includes the study of mechanical nature of how an object works. Mechanical elements refer to mechanical structure, mechanism, thermo-fluid, and hydraulic aspects of a mechatronics system. The study of thermodynamics, dynamics, fluid mechanics, pneumatics and hydraulics. Mechatronics engineer who works a mechanical engineer can specialize in hydraulics and pneumatics systems, where they can be found working in automobile industries. A mechatronics engineer can also design a vehicle since they have strong mechanical and electronical background. Knowledge of software applications such as computer-aided design and computer aided manufacturing is essential for designing products. Mechatronics covers a part of mechanical syllabus which is widely applied in automobile industry.

Mechatronic systems represent a large part of the functions of an automobile. The control loop formed by sensor—information processing—actuator—mechanical (physical) change is found in many systems. The system size can be very different. The Anti-lock braking system (ABS) is a mechatronic system. The brake itself is also one. And the control loop formed by driving control (for example cruise control), engine, vehicle driving speed in the real world and speed measurement is a mechatronic system, too. The great importance of mechatronics for automotive engineering is also evident from the fact that vehicle manufacturers often have development departments with "Mechatronics" in their names.

Electronics and Electricals 

Electronics and Telecommunication engineering specializes in electronics devices and telecom devices of a mechatronics system. A mechatronics engineer specialized in electronics and telecommunications have knowledge of computer hardware devices. The transmission of signal is the main application of this subfield of mechatronics. Where digital and analog systems also forms an important part of mechatronics systems. Telecommunications engineering deals with the transmission of information across a medium.

Electronics engineering is related to computer engineering and electrical engineering. Control engineering has a wide range of electronic applications from the flight and propulsion systems of commercial airplanes to the cruise control present in many modern cars. VLSI designing is important for creating integrated circuits. Mechatronics engineers have deep knowledge of microprocessors, microcontrollers, microchips and semiconductors. The application of mechatronics in electronics manufacturing industry can conduct research and development on consumer electronic devices such as mobile phones, computers, cameras etc. For mechatronics engineers it is necessary to learn operating computer applications such as MATLAB and Simulink for designing and developing electronic products.

Mechatronics engineering is a interdisciplinary course, it includes concepts of both electrical and mechanical systems. A mechatronics engineer engages in designing high power transformers or  radio-frequency module transmitters.

Avionics 

Avionics is also considered a variant of mechatronics as it combines several fields such as electronics and telecom with Aerospace engineering. It is the subdiscipline of mechatronics engineering and aerospace engineering which is engineering branch focusing on electronics systems of aircraft. The word avionics is a blend of aviation and electronics. The electronics system of aircraft includes aircraft communication addressing and reporting system, air navigation, aircraft flight control system, aircraft collision avoidance systems, flight recorder, weather radar and lightning detector. These can be as simple as a searchlight for a police helicopter or as complicated as the tactical system for an airborne early warning platform.

Advanced Mechatronics 

Another variant is Motion control for Advanced Mechatronics, presently recognized as a key technology in mechatronics. The robustness of motion control will be represented as a function of stiffness and a basis for practical realization. Target of motion is parameterized by control stiffness which could be variable according to the task reference. The system robustness of motion always requires very high stiffness in the controller.

Industrial 

The branch of industrial engineer includes the design of machinery, assembly and process lines of various manufacturing industries. This branch can be said somewhat similar to automation and robotics. Mechatronics engineers who works as industrial engineers design and develop infrastructure of a manufacturing plant. Also it can be said that they are architect of machines. One can work as an industrial designer to design the industrial layout and plan for setting up of a manufacturing industry or as an industrial technician to lookover the technical requirements and repairing of the particular factory.

Robotics 

Robotics is one of the newest emerging subfield of mechatronics. It is the study of robots that how they are manufactured and operated. Since 2000, this branch of mechatronics is attracting a number of aspirants. Robotics is interrelated with automation because here also not much human intervention is required. A large number of factories especially in automobile factories, robots are founds in assembly lines where they perform the job of drilling, installation and fitting. Programming skills are necessary for specialization in robotics. Knowledge of programming language —ROBOTC is important for functioning robots. An industrial robot is a prime example of a mechatronics system; it includes aspects of electronics, mechanics, and computing to do its day-to-day jobs.

Computer 

The Internet of things (IoT) is the inter-networking of physical devices, embedded with electronics, software, sensors, actuators, and network connectivity which enable these objects to collect and exchange data. IoT and mechatronics are complementary. Many of the smart components associated with the Internet of Things will be essentially mechatronic. The development of the IoT is forcing mechatronics engineers, designers, practitioners and educators to research the ways in which mechatronic systems and components are perceived, designed and manufactured. This allows them to face up to new issues such as data security, machine ethics and the human-machine interface.

Knowledge of programming is very important. A mechatronics engineer has to do programming in different levels example.—PLC programming, drone programming, hardware programming, CNC programming etc. Due to combination of electronics engineering, soft skills from computer side is important. Important programming languages for mechatronics engineer to learn is Java, Python, C++ and C programming language.

See also
 
 Automation engineering
 Cybernetics
 Control theory
 Ecomechatronics
 Electromechanics
 Materials engineering 
 Mechanical engineering technology
 Robotics 
 Systems engineering
Biomechatronics

References

Sources
 Bradley, Dawson et al., Mechatronics, Electronics in products and processes, Chapman and Hall Verlag, London, 1991.
 Karnopp, Dean C., Donald L. Margolis, Ronald C. Rosenberg, System Dynamics: Modeling and Simulation of Mechatronic Systems, 4th Edition, Wiley, 2006.  Bestselling system dynamics book using bond graph approach.
 Cetinkunt, Sabri, Mechatronics, John Wiley & Sons, Inc, 2007  
 
Zhang, Jianhua . Mechatronics and Automation Engineering. Proceedings of the International Conference on Mechatronics and Automation Engineering (ICMAE2016). Xiamen, China, 2016.

Further reading
 Bishop, Robert H., Mechatronics: an introduction. CRC Press, 2006.
 De Silva, Clarence W., Mechatronics: an integrated approach. CRC Press, 2005
  Onwubolu, Godfrey C., Mechatronics: principles and applications. Butterworth-Heinemann, 2005.
  Rankers, Adrian M., Machine Dynamics in Mechatronic Systems. University Twente, 1997

External links
IEEE/ASME Transactions on Mechatronics.
Mechatronics Journal – Elsevier
mechatronic applications and realisation List of publications concerning examples
Institution of Mechanical Engineers - Mechatronics, Informatics and Control Group (MICG) 
 NF E 01-010 2008 – AFNOR (French standard NF E 01-010)
 XP E 01-013 2009 – AFNOR (French standard NF E 01-013)

Embedded systems
Electromechanical engineering
Wasei-eigo